Roxroy Cato (born 5 January 1988, St. Mary, Jamaica) is a Jamaican athlete specialising in the 400 metres hurdles. He placed 5th in his heat in a time of 49.03s at the 2012 Olympics.

Competition record

1Disqualified in the semifinals

Personal bests
Outdoor
400 metres hurdles – 48.48 (Kingston 2014)
Indoor
400 metres – 47.39 (State College 2014)

References

External links

1988 births
Living people
Jamaican male hurdlers
Athletes (track and field) at the 2012 Summer Olympics
Athletes (track and field) at the 2016 Summer Olympics
Olympic athletes of Jamaica
Athletes (track and field) at the 2014 Commonwealth Games
St. Augustine's University (North Carolina) alumni
Athletes (track and field) at the 2015 Pan American Games
Pan American Games bronze medalists for Jamaica
Pan American Games medalists in athletics (track and field)
World Athletics Championships athletes for Jamaica
People from Saint Mary Parish, Jamaica
Central American and Caribbean Games gold medalists for Jamaica
Competitors at the 2010 Central American and Caribbean Games
Central American and Caribbean Games medalists in athletics
Medalists at the 2015 Pan American Games
Commonwealth Games competitors for Jamaica